Raven Girl is a 2013 novel by Audrey Niffenegger.

Plot
A postman who encounters a fledgling raven while on the edge of his route decides to bring her home. The unlikely couple falls in love and conceives a child—an extraordinary raven girl trapped in a human body.

Reception
Douglas Wolk of the Washington Post said of the book "the happy ending that the story cuts corners to reach feels as hollow as a bird’s bones." A review from NPR noted that the book "like the sad creature at its center, lingers in the memory: odd, quiet, more than a little unsettling, but strangely, even hauntingly, beautiful."

Adaptation
In 2013, The Royal Ballet asked Niffenegger to adapt the book into a ballet which was performed at the Royal Opera House.

References

2013 American novels
American fantasy novels
2013 fantasy novels
Novels adapted into ballets
Abrams Books books